The 1952 Georgia Bulldogs football team represented the Georgia Bulldogs of the University of Georgia during the 1952 college football season.

Schedule

Source: GeorgiaDogs.com: 1952 football schedule

Roster
Zeke Bratkowski, Jr.
  Robert (Bobby) Dellinger, RB
Robert K West, DE #52 Captain 1952

References

Georgia
Georgia Bulldogs football seasons
Georgia Bulldogs football